The 1972–73 Phoenix Suns season was the fifth for the Phoenix Suns of the National Basketball Association. The season began under head coach Butch Van Breda Kolff for the first seven games, before Jerry Colangelo finished coaching duties for the team. All home games were played at Arizona Veterans Memorial Coliseum.

Charlie Scott had played in six games for the Suns one season ago, after a late-season switch to the NBA from the ABA, and his first full season with the Suns was arguably his best. Scott was named to his first NBA All-Star Team, joining teammate Connie Hawkins, who was selected to his fourth and final All-Star Game of his NBA career. In addition to Scott leading the Suns with his 6.1 assist per game average, his 2,048-season-point total was fifth in the league (and the only 2,000+-point season of his career). His average of 25.3 points per contest was sixth-best in the NBA. Center Neal Walk averaged career-bests in both points and rebounds, averaging 20.2 and 12.5 on the season. Walk's rebounding average was just shy of Paul Silas's franchise record of 12.5. Dick Van Arsdale averaged 18.4 points on the season, while Connie Hawkins contributed 16.1 per contest.

Offseason

NBA Draft

Roster
{| class="toccolours" style="font-size: 85%; width: 100%;"
|-
! colspan="2" style="background-color: #423189;  color: #FF8800; text-align: center;" | Phoenix Suns roster
|- style="background-color: #FF8800; color: #423189;   text-align: center;"
! Players !! Coaches
|-
| valign="top" |
{| class="sortable" style="background:transparent; margin:0px; width:100%;"
! Pos. !! # !! Nat. !! Name !! Height !! Weight !! DOB (Y-M-D) !! From
|-

Regular season

Standings

Record vs. opponents

Game log

!!Streak
|-
|- align="center" bgcolor="#ffcccc"
| 1
| October 13
| Milwaukee
| L 105–117
| Charlie Scott (26)
| Arizona Veterans Memorial Coliseum12,408
| 0–1
| L 1
|- align="center" bgcolor="#ccffcc"
| 2
| October 14
| @ Portland
| W 124–120
| Charlie Scott (38)
| Memorial Coliseum6,804
| 1–1
| W 1
|- align="center" bgcolor="#ccffcc"
| 3
| October 15
| Baltimore
| W 107–98
| Neal Walk (27)
| Arizona Veterans Memorial Coliseum6,372
| 2–1
| W 2
|- align="center" bgcolor="#ccffcc"
| 4
| October 21
| Seattle
| W 129–117
| Charlie Scott (30)
| Arizona Veterans Memorial Coliseum8,315
| 3–1
| W 3
|- align="center" bgcolor="#ffcccc"
| 5
| October 24
| Chicago
| L 106–107
| Charlie Scott (42)
| Arizona Veterans Memorial Coliseum9,039
| 3–2
| L 1
|- align="center" bgcolor="#ffcccc"
| 6
| October 27
| @ Seattle
| L 115–120
| Charlie Scott (23)
| Seattle Center Coliseum8,201
| 3–3
| L 2
|- align="center" bgcolor="#ffcccc"
| 7
| October 29
| @ Los Angeles
| L 123–133
| Charlie Scott (25)
| The Forum16,148
| 3–4
| L 3
|-
!!Streak
|-
|- align="center" bgcolor="#ffcccc"
| 8
| November 3
| @ Chicago
| L 100–115
| Neal Walk (19)
| Chicago Stadium11,089
| 3–5
| L 4
|- align="center" bgcolor="#ccffcc"
| 9
| November 4
| @ Milwaukee
| W 105–104
| Charlie Scott,Neal Walk (20)
| Milwaukee Arena10,746
| 4–5
| W 1
|- align="center" bgcolor="#ccffcc"
| 10
| November 5
| @ Cleveland
| W 107–106
| Dick Van Arsdale (28)
| Cleveland Arena3,624
| 5–5
| W 2
|- align="center" bgcolor="#ccffcc"
| 11
| November 8
| Cleveland
| W 107–99
| Charlie Scott (34)
| Arizona Veterans Memorial Coliseum7,264
| 6–5
| W 3
|- align="center" bgcolor="#ccffcc"
| 12
| November 10
| Houston
| W 115–109
| Charlie Scott (26)
| Arizona Veterans Memorial Coliseum8,613
| 7–5
| W 4
|- align="center" bgcolor="#ccffcc"
| 13
| November 12
| Philadelphia
| W 119–108
| Charlie Scott (33)
| Arizona Veterans Memorial Coliseum8,235
| 8–5
| W 5
|- align="center" bgcolor="#ffcccc"
| 14
| November 14
| @ New York
| L 97–103
| Charlie Scott (25)
| Madison Square Garden18,720
| 8–6
| L 1
|- align="center" bgcolor="#ffcccc"
| 15
| November 15
| @ Boston
| L 94–113
| Charlie Scott (33)
| Boston Garden8,979
| 8–7
| L 2
|- align="center" bgcolor="#ffcccc"
| 16
| November 17
| @ Baltimore
| L 106–117
| Charlie Scott (27)
| Baltimore Civic Center5,429
| 8–8
| L 3
|- align="center" bgcolor="#ffcccc"
| 17
| November 18
| @ Atlanta
| L 122–126
| Dick Van Arsdale (26)
| Omni Coliseum7,047
| 8–9
| L 4
|- align="center" bgcolor="#ffcccc"
| 18
| November 21
| @ Kansas City-Omaha
| L 96–101
| Charlie Scott (23)
| Municipal Auditorium5,067
| 8–10
| L 5
|- align="center" bgcolor="#ccffcc"
| 19
| November 23
| Detroit
| W 128–122
| Charlie Scott (42)
| Arizona Veterans Memorial Coliseum7,576
| 9–10
| W 1
|- align="center" bgcolor="#ffcccc"
| 20
| November 25
| Los Angeles
| L 109–116
| Neal Walk (32)
| Arizona Veterans Memorial Coliseum10,482
| 9–11
| L 1
|- align="center" bgcolor="#ffcccc"
| 21
| November 26
| @ Los Angeles
| L 107–112
| Neal Walk (25)
| The Forum17,505
| 9–12
| L 2
|- align="center" bgcolor="#ffcccc"
| 22
| November 28
| @ Golden State
| L 102–110
| Charlie Scott (24)
| Oakland–Alameda County Coliseum Arena5,043
| 9–13
| L 3
|- align="center" bgcolor="#ccffcc"
| 23
| November 29
| Atlanta
| W 109–98
| Connie Hawkins,Charlie Scott (27)
| Arizona Veterans Memorial Coliseum7,241
| 10–13
| W 1
|-
!!Streak
|-
|- align="center" bgcolor="#ccffcc"
| 24
| December 1
| Golden State
| W 115–106
| Connie Hawkins (31)
| Arizona Veterans Memorial Coliseum8,067
| 11–13
| W 2
|- align="center" bgcolor="#ffcccc"
| 25
| December 3
| Milwaukee
| L 101–119
| Connie Hawkins (19)
| Arizona Veterans Memorial Coliseum8,531
| 11–14
| L 1
|- align="center" bgcolor="#ffcccc"
| 26
| December 5
| @ Buffalo
| L 97–108
| Dick Van Arsdale (29)
| Buffalo Memorial Auditorium3,573
| 11–15
| L 2
|- align="center" bgcolor="#ffcccc"
| 27
| December 6
| @ Detroit
| L 105–114
| Charlie Scott (28)
| Cobo Arena2,864
| 11–16
| L 3
|- align="center" bgcolor="#ccffcc"
| 28
| December 7
| @ Philadelphia
| W 117–102
| Neal Walk (27)
| Pittsburgh, PA3,878
| 12–16
| W 1
|- align="center" bgcolor="#ccffcc"
| 29
| December 9
| Portland
| W 116–97
| Neal Walk (26)
| Arizona Veterans Memorial Coliseum7,801
| 13–16
| W 2
|- align="center" bgcolor="#ffcccc"
| 30
| December 10
| @ Seattle
| L 102–110
| Dick Van Arsdale (23)
| Seattle Center Coliseum10,628
| 13–17
| L 1
|- align="center" bgcolor="#ffcccc"
| 31
| December 13
| Boston
| L 100–105
| Connie Hawkins (27)
| Arizona Veterans Memorial Coliseum8,596
| 13–18
| L 2
|- align="center" bgcolor="#ccffcc"
| 32
| December 17
| Kansas City-Omaha
| W 112–102
| Charlie Scott (26)
| Arizona Veterans Memorial Coliseum6,537
| 14–18
| W 1
|- align="center" bgcolor="#ccffcc"
| 33
| December 19
| New York
| W 117–84
| Clem Haskins (28)
| Arizona Veterans Memorial Coliseum8,197
| 15–18
| W 2
|- align="center" bgcolor="#ccffcc"
| 34
| December 22
| @ Los Angeles
| W 118–110
| Neal Walk (33)
| The Forum16,733
| 16–18
| W 3
|- align="center" bgcolor="#ccffcc"
| 35
| December 25
| Chicago
| W 115–108
| Dick Van Arsdale (32)
| Arizona Veterans Memorial Coliseum10,420
| 17–18
| W 4
|- align="center" bgcolor="#ffcccc"
| 36
| December 26
| @ Houston
| L 110–113
| Charlie Scott (32)
| Hofheinz Pavilion3,577
| 17–19
| L 1
|- align="center" bgcolor="#ccffcc"
| 37
| December 29
| Portland
| W 106–99
| Charlie Scott (29)
| Arizona Veterans Memorial Coliseum10,310
| 18–19
| W 1
|- align="center" bgcolor="#ccffcc"
| 38
| December 30
| @ Portland
| W 107–104
| Charlie Scott (38)
| Memorial Coliseum8,349
| 19–19
| W 2
|-
!!Streak
|-
|- align="center" bgcolor="#ffcccc"
| 39
| January 2
| @ Cleveland
| L 88–111
| Connie Hawkins (19)
| Cleveland Arena2,850
| 19–20
| L 1
|- align="center" bgcolor="#ffcccc"
| 40
| January 3
| @ Detroit
| L 105–119
| Charlie Scott (27)
| Cobo Arena3,626
| 19–21
| L 2
|- align="center" bgcolor="#ccffcc"
| 41
| January 5
| @ Chicago
| W 126–115
| Dick Van Arsdale (37)
| Chicago Stadium9,091
| 20–21
| W 1
|- align="center" bgcolor="#ccffcc"
| 42
| January 6
| @ Kansas City-Omaha
| W 118–112
| Charlie Scott (28)
| Omaha Civic Auditorium5,183
| 21–21
| W 2
|- align="center" bgcolor="#ccffcc"
| 43
| January 10
| Detroit
| W 123–121
| Charlie Scott (37)
| Arizona Veterans Memorial Coliseum8,099
| 22–21
| W 3
|- align="center" bgcolor="#ffcccc"
| 44
| January 12
| Golden State
| L 107–108
| Charlie Scott (33)
| Arizona Veterans Memorial Coliseum12,103
| 22–22
| L 1
|- align="center" bgcolor="#ccffcc"
| 45
| January 13
| @ Golden State
| W 116–110
| Neal Walk (28)
| Oakland–Alameda County Coliseum Arena8,484
| 23–22
| W 1
|- align="center" bgcolor="#ffcccc"
| 46
| January 14
| Baltimore
| L 94–95
| Charlie Scott (32)
| Arizona Veterans Memorial Coliseum7,186
| 23–23
| L 1
|- align="center" bgcolor="#ffcccc"
| 47
| January 16
| New York
| L 101–102
| Dick Van Arsdale (23)
| Arizona Veterans Memorial Coliseum8,252
| 23–24
| L 2
|- align="center" bgcolor="#ffcccc"
| 48
| January 18
| Kansas City-Omaha
| L 96–119
| Dick Van Arsdale (18)
| Arizona Veterans Memorial Coliseum8,117
| 23–25
| L 3
|- align="center" bgcolor="#ffcccc"
| 49
| January 20
| Los Angeles
| L 104–124
| Neal Walk (29)
| Arizona Veterans Memorial Coliseum12,608
| 23–26
| L 4
|- align="center"
|colspan="9" bgcolor="#bbcaff"|All-Star Break
|- align="center" bgcolor="#ccffcc"
| 50
| January 25
| Seattle
| W 112–109
| Charlie Scott (34)
| Arizona Veterans Memorial Coliseum5,701
| 24–26
| W 1
|- align="center" bgcolor="#ccffcc"
| 51
| January 26
| @ Portland
| W 120–116
| Charlie Scott (33)
| Memorial Coliseum10,057
| 25–26
| W 2
|- align="center" bgcolor="#ffcccc"
| 52
| January 27
| Portland
| L 109–117
| Dick Van Arsdale (28)
| Arizona Veterans Memorial Coliseum7,215
| 25–27
| L 1
|-
!!Streak
|-
|- align="center" bgcolor="#ffcccc"
| 53
| February 1
| Los Angeles
| L 106–120
| Neal Walk (29)
| Arizona Veterans Memorial Coliseum10,705
| 25–28
| L 2
|- align="center" bgcolor="#ccffcc"
| 54
| February 3
| Houston
| W 132–123
| Charlie Scott,Dick Van Arsdale (26)
| Arizona Veterans Memorial Coliseum7,282
| 26–28
| W 1
|- align="center" bgcolor="#ffcccc"
| 55
| February 6
| @ Milwaukee
| L 111–126
| Charlie Scott (29)
| Milwaukee Arena9,285
| 26–29
| L 1
|- align="center" bgcolor="#ffcccc"
| 56
| February 7
| @ Detroit
| L 107–113
| Charlie Scott,Dick Van Arsdale (21)
| Cobo Arena4,491
| 26–30
| L 2
|- align="center" bgcolor="#ccffcc"
| 57
| February 8
| Seattle
| W 125–112
| Charlie Scott (28)
| Arizona Veterans Memorial Coliseum7,084
| 27–30
| W 1
|- align="center" bgcolor="#ccffcc"
| 58
| February 10
| Philadelphia
| W 126–121
| Charlie Scott (27)
| Arizona Veterans Memorial Coliseum9,176
| 28–30
| W 2
|- align="center" bgcolor="#ccffcc"
| 59
| February 14
| Buffalo
| W 124–107
| Neal Walk (25)
| Arizona Veterans Memorial Coliseum6,871
| 29–30
| W 3
|- align="center" bgcolor="#ffcccc"
| 60
| February 16
| Atlanta
| L 104–111
| Dick Van Arsdale (28)
| Arizona Veterans Memorial Coliseum10,155
| 29–31
| L 1
|- align="center" bgcolor="#ffcccc"
| 61
| February 17
| @ Houston
| L 111–127
| Charlie Scott (41)
| Hofheinz Pavilion3,119
| 29–32
| L 2
|- align="center" bgcolor="#ffcccc"
| 62
| February 18
| Portland
| L 118–119
| Neal Walk (23)
| Arizona Veterans Memorial Coliseum5,260
| 29–33
| L 3
|- align="center" bgcolor="#ffcccc"
| 63
| February 20
| @ Boston
| L 97–107
| Charlie Scott (25)
| Boston Garden9,954
| 29–34
| L 4
|- align="center" bgcolor="#ccffcc"
| 64
| February 21
| @ Baltimore
| W 107–98
| Charlie Scott (27)
| Baltimore Civic Center5,525
| 30–34
| W 1
|- align="center" bgcolor="#ccffcc"
| 65
| February 23
| @ Buffalo
| W 125–106
| Charlie Scott (29)
| Buffalo Memorial Auditorium5,830
| 31–34
| W 2
|- align="center" bgcolor="#ffcccc"
| 66
| February 24
| @ Chicago
| L 100–122
| Charlie Scott (26)
| Chicago Stadium12,753
| 31–35
| L 1
|- align="center" bgcolor="#ccffcc"
| 67
| February 25
| @ Kansas City-Omaha
| W 111–109
| Charlie Scott (24)
| Municipal Auditorium10,007
| 32–35
| W 1
|- align="center" bgcolor="#ffcccc"
| 68
| February 28
| Kansas City-Omaha
| L 107–109
| Charlie Scott (29)
| Arizona Veterans Memorial Coliseum7,230
| 32–36
| L 1
|-
!!Streak
|-
|- align="center" bgcolor="#ffcccc"
| 69
| March 4
| Chicago
| L 117–118 (OT)
| Neal Walk (30)
| Arizona Veterans Memorial Coliseum7,085
| 32–37
| L 2
|- align="center" bgcolor="#ccffcc"
| 70
| March 6
| Cleveland
| W 110–102
| Neal Walk (26)
| Arizona Veterans Memorial Coliseum5,236
| 33–37
| W 1
|- align="center" bgcolor="#ffcccc"
| 71
| March 8
| Boston
| L 134–141 (OT)
| Charlie Scott (29)
| Arizona Veterans Memorial Coliseum10,052
| 33–38
| L 1
|- align="center" bgcolor="#ffcccc"
| 72
| March 10
| Detroit
| L 110–117
| Clem Haskins,Charlie Scott (23)
| Arizona Veterans Memorial Coliseum7,510
| 33–39
| L 2
|- align="center" bgcolor="#ffcccc"
| 73
| March 12
| @ Milwaukee
| L 95–126
| Neal Walk (22)
| Milwaukee Arena10,746
| 33–40
| L 3
|- align="center" bgcolor="#ffcccc"
| 74
| March 13
| @ New York
| L 111–115
| Charlie Scott (33)
| Madison Square Garden19,674
| 33–41
| L 4
|- align="center" bgcolor="#ccffcc"
| 75
| March 14
| @ Philadelphia
| W 120–114
| Charlie Scott (32)
| The Spectrum5,641
| 34–41
| W 1
|- align="center" bgcolor="#ffcccc"
| 76
| March 16
| @ Atlanta
| L 127–135
| Charlie Scott (31)
| Omni Coliseum6,512
| 34–42
| L 1
|- align="center" bgcolor="#ffcccc"
| 77
| March 18
| @ Los Angeles
| L 113–131
| Charlie Scott (35)
| The Forum17,505
| 34–43
| L 2
|- align="center" bgcolor="#ccffcc"
| 78
| March 21
| Buffalo
| W 134–124 (OT)
| Charlie Scott (30)
| Arizona Veterans Memorial Coliseum7,603
| 35–43
| W 1
|- align="center" bgcolor="#ccffcc"
| 79
| March 23
| Golden State
| W 125–124
| Charlie Scott (28)
| Arizona Veterans Memorial Coliseum8,197
| 36–43
| W 2
|- align="center" bgcolor="#ffcccc"
| 80
| March 25
| Milwaukee
| L 112–114
| Neal Walk (24)
| Arizona Veterans Memorial Coliseum9,386
| 36–44
| L 1
|- align="center" bgcolor="#ccffcc"
| 81
| March 26
| @ Golden State
| W 120–114
| Connie Hawkins (29)
| Oakland–Alameda County Coliseum Arena3,677
| 37–44
| W 1
|- align="center" bgcolor="#ccffcc"
| 82
| March 28
| @ Seattle
| W 127–125
| Neal Walk (27)
| Seattle Center Coliseum11,246
| 38–44
| W 2
|-

Awards and honors

All-Star
 Charlie Scott was selected as a reserve for the Western Conference in the All-Star Game. It was his first All-Star selection.
 Connie Hawkins was selected to replace Rick Barry in the All-Star Game. It was his fourth consecutive All-Star selection.

Player statistics

Season

Transactions

Trades

Free agents

Subtractions

References
 Standings on Basketball Reference

Phoenix
Phoenix Suns seasons